Bjørn Tore Godal (born 20 January 1945) is a Norwegian politician for the Labour Party. He was Minister of Foreign Affairs from 1994–1997 and 
Minister of Defence from 2000–2001 in Stoltenberg's First Cabinet. From 2003-2007 he was the Norwegian ambassador to Germany. Since 2007, he has acted as special adviser to the Norwegian State Department in international energy and climate issues.

References

1945 births
Living people
Foreign Ministers of Norway
Ministers of Trade and Shipping of Norway
21st-century Norwegian politicians
20th-century Norwegian politicians
Politicians from Skien
Defence ministers of Norway